The Chicago Pacific Corporation was a shell corporation created from the remains of the Chicago, Rock Island and Pacific Railroad. It managed to use much of the capital made from the liquidation of the Rock Island to acquire non-rail ventures such as The Hoover Company, Pennsylvania House/Kittinger, Inc., and Rowenta A.G.. In 1988, the now profitable company was acquired by the Maytag Corporation.

References

Holding companies established in 1984
Chicago, Rock Island and Pacific Railroad
American companies established in 1984